Lonesome Luke's Honeymoon is a 1917 American short comedy film starring Harold Lloyd.

Cast
 Harold Lloyd - Lonesome Luke
 Bebe Daniels
 Snub Pollard
 Arthur Mumas
 Sammy Brooks
 W.L. Adams
 Bud Jamison
 Gilbert Pratt
 Max Hamburger
 Estelle Harrison
 Florence Burns
 Margaret Strong
 Beth Darwin
 Sis Matthews
 Wilma Morris
 Dorothea Wolbert
 Charles Stevenson

See also
 Harold Lloyd filmography

References

External links

1917 films
1917 short films
American silent short films
1917 comedy films
American black-and-white films
Films directed by Hal Roach
Silent American comedy films
Lonesome Luke films
American comedy short films
1910s American films